Pelecystola nearctica is a moth of the family Tineidae. It is found across eastern North America, from Quebec to northern Florida, west to Arkansas.

The length of the forewings is 5.4-6.2 mm for males and 7–8.5 for females. Adults are on wing from April to September.

External links
First report of the old world genus Pelecystola in North America, with description of a new species (Lepidoptera, Tineidae)

Tineidae
Moths described in 2009